This article is a collection of statewide public opinion polls that have been conducted relating to the March Democratic presidential primaries, 2008.

Polling

Mississippi
Mississippi winner: Barack Obama
Format: Primary see: Mississippi Democratic primary, 2008
Date: 11 March 2008
Delegates At Stake 33
Delegates Won To be determined

Ohio
Ohio winner: Hillary Clinton
Format: Primary see: Ohio Democratic primary, 2008
Date: March 4, 2008
Delegates At Stake 141
Delegates Won To be determined

Rhode Island
Rhode Island winner: Hillary Clinton
Format: Primary see: Rhode Island Democratic primary, 2008
Date: March 4, 2008
Delegates At Stake 21
Delegates Won To be determinedSee also

Texas
Texas winner: Unclear (see Texas Democratic primary and caucuses, 2008 for details)
Format: Primary-Caucus Hybrid see: Texas Democratic primary and caucuses, 2008
Date: March 4, 2008
Delegates At Stake 193
Delegates Won To be determinedSee also

Vermont
Vermont winner: Barack Obama
Format: Primary see: Vermont Democratic primary, 2008
Date: March 4, 2008
Delegates At Stake 15
Delegates Won To be determinedSee also

References

External links

 2008 Democratic National Convention Website-FAQ gives map with delegation information.
USAElectionPolls.com – Primary polling by state

2008 United States Democratic presidential primaries
Democratic